Kells Irish Pub is a pub in Portland, Oregon, United States. The restaurant is housed in the Glisan Building, in the southwest portion of the city's Old Town Chinatown neighborhood. Opened in 1990, the restaurant is owned and operated by Gerard and Lucille McAleese. Their son Garrett opened Kells Brew Pub (now Kells Brewery) in northwest Portland in 2012. Since 1995, money affixed to the ceiling has been donated to charity. The restaurant also hosts an annual Kells Irish Festival, and hosted the first Irish Beer Festival in 2017.

See also
 List of Irish themed restaurants

References

External links
 

1990 establishments in Oregon
European restaurants in Portland, Oregon
Irish restaurants in the United States
Old Town Chinatown
Restaurants established in 1990
Southwest Portland, Oregon